The 2018 ATP Shenzhen Open was a professional men's tennis tournament played on hard courts. It was the 5th edition of the tournament, and part of the ATP World Tour 250 series of the 2018 ATP World Tour.  It took place at the Shenzhen Longgang Tennis Centre in Shenzhen, China from September 24 to 30.

Singles main draw entrants

Seeds

 1 Rankings are as of September 17, 2018

Other entrants
  Andy Murray
  Wu Di  
  Zhang Zhizhen  

The following players received entry from the qualifying draw:
  Tatsuma Ito  
  Jason Jung
  Yoshihito Nishioka
  Ramkumar Ramanathan

Withdrawals
Before the tournament
  Denis Istomin →replaced by  Mackenzie McDonald
  Benoît Paire →replaced by  Jiří Veselý

Retirements
  Guillermo García López
  Lukáš Lacko
  Zhang Zhizhen

Doubles main draw entrants

Seeds

 1 Rankings are as of September 1, 2018

Other entrants 
The following pairs received wildcards into the doubles main draw:
  Li Zhe /  Wu Di 
  Sun Fajing /  Zhang Zhizhen

Withdrawals 
During the tournament
  Denis Kudla

Champions

Singles

  Yoshihito Nishioka def.  Pierre-Hugues Herbert, 7–5, 2–6, 6–4

Doubles

  Ben McLachlan /  Joe Salisbury def.  Robert Lindstedt /  Rajeev Ram, 7–6(7–5), 7–6(7–4).

References

External links
Official site

ATP Shenzhen Open
ATP Shenzhen Open
2018 in Chinese tennis
Shenzhen Open
Shenzhen Open